Sunyata Dance ( 空之舞 ) is a work for clarinet and symphony orchestra,
composed by He Xuntian in 2011.

Summary
Sunyata Dance (2011) was written especially for clarinet and symphony orchestra. Sunyata is an ancient Sanskrit word. The works practice from beginning to end without stopping. With the unique technique and musicality of clarinet, this works will achieve the peak of the performance art and technique. The soloist of this works is the “highly expressive and creative” clarinetist He Yemo.

Inspiration

Sunyata Dance was inspired from Xuntian He’s ideology:
 Udumbara don’t smell like papaver.
Five Nons: Non-Western, non-Eastern, non-academic, non-folk, and non-non.

First performance
8. November 2014 Shanghai, Concert Hall, Oriental Art Center (CN) 
Clarinetist: He Yemo
Dirigent: James Judd 
Israel Symphony Orchestra

References

External links
Sunyata Dance  published by Schott Music International, Germany

Compositions by He Xuntian
Compositions for clarinet
Compositions for symphony orchestra
2011 compositions